Kalungu District is a district in Central Uganda. It is named after the main town of the district, Kalungu, where the district headquarters are located.

Location
Kalungu District is bordered by Gomba District to the north, Butambala District to the north-east, Mpigi District to the east, Masaka District to the south, and Bukomansimbi District to the west.

Overview
Kalungu District was created by Act of Parliament, carved from Masaka District. The district began functioning on 1 July 2010.

Population
In 1991, the national population census estimated the district population at 152,030. The 2002 national census put the population at approximately 160,700. As of July 2012, the population was estimated at 177,200.

References

External links
Kalungu District Homepage
Kalungu District Population Government Website

 
Districts of Uganda
Central Region, Uganda
Lake Victoria